Chantal Bourragué (born 3 March 1946 in Angoulême, Charente) is a member of the National Assembly of France.  She represents the first constituency of the Gironde department and is a member of the Union for a Popular Movement.

References

1946 births
Living people
People from Angoulême
University of Bordeaux alumni
Union for a Popular Movement politicians
Women members of the National Assembly (France)
Deputies of the 12th National Assembly of the French Fifth Republic
Deputies of the 13th National Assembly of the French Fifth Republic
21st-century French women politicians
Politicians from Nouvelle-Aquitaine